{{Infobox election
| election_name     = 2004 United States Senate election in California
| country           = California
| type              = presidential
| ongoing           = no
| previous_election = 1998 United States Senate election in California
| previous_year     = 1998
| next_election     = 2010 United States Senate election in California
| next_year         = 2010
| election_date     = November 2, 2004
| image_size        = 145x150px

| image1            = Barbara Boxer 2005 (cropped).jpg
| nominee1          = Barbara Boxer
| party1            = Democratic Party (United States)
| popular_vote1     = 6,955,728
| percentage1       = 57.7%

| image2            = Bill Jones of California (cropped).jpg
| nominee2          = Bill Jones
| party2            = Republican Party (United States)
| popular_vote2     = 4,555,922
| percentage2       = 37.8%

| map_image         = 2004 United States Senate election in California results map by county.svg
| map_size          = 230px
| map_caption       = County results Boxer:       Jones:    
| title             = U.S. Senator
| before_election   = Barbara Boxer
| before_party      = Democratic Party (United States)
| after_election    = Barbara Boxer
| after_party       = Democratic Party (United States)
}}

The 2004 United States Senate election in California''' took place on November 2, 2004 alongside other elections to the United States Senate in other states as well as elections to the United States House of Representatives and various state and local elections. Incumbent Democratic U.S. Senator Barbara Boxer ran for re-election and defeated Republican former Secretary of State Bill Jones. Boxer's 6.96 million votes set the all-time record for the most votes cast for one candidate in one state in one election, although it was surpassed by Senator Dianne Feinstein's 7.75 million votes in 2012.

Democratic primary

Candidates 
 Barbara Boxer, incumbent U.S. Senator

Results

Republican primary

Candidates 
 Danney Ball, activist
 Toni Casey, former Mayor of Los Altos Hills
 Barry L. Hatch, activist
 Bill Jones, former Secretary of State of California and candidate for Governor in 2002
 Howard Kaloogian, former State Assemblyman and Former Chairman of the Recall Gray Davis Committee
 Rosario Marin, former Treasurer of the United States
 James Stewart, businessman
 Tim Stoen, Assistant District Attorney
 Bill Quraishi, businessman
 John Van Zandt, businessman

Results

Third party primaries

American Independent

Libertarian

Peace and Freedom

General election

Candidates

Major 
 Barbara Boxer (D), incumbent U.S. Senator
 Bill Jones (R), former California Secretary of State

Minor 
 Marsha Feinland (PF), perennial candidate
 James P. Gray (L), Superior Court jurist
 Don J. Grundmann (AI)

Campaign 
Boxer originally had decided to retire in 2004 but changed her mind to "fight for the right to dissent" against conservatives like Majority Leader Tom DeLay. Jones was widely considered as the underdog. Jones got a major endorsement form the popular Governor Arnold Schwarzenegger. The two major candidates had a debate. Pre-election polling had Boxer leading in double digits. But he never released a single TV ad. Boxer portrayed Jones as too conservative for California, citing his votes in the California Assembly (1982 to 1994) against gun control, increased minimum wage, support for offshore drilling, and a loosening of environmental regulations.

Fundraising 
Jones raised about $700,000 more than Boxer during the third quarter, pulling in $2.5 million to Boxer's $1.8 million. But overall, Boxer has raised $16 million to Jones' $6.2 million. And Boxer has spent about $7 million on radio and television ads alone.

Predictions

Polling

Results

Overall 
The election was not close, with Boxer winning by an authoritative 20 point margin. Jones only performed well in rural parts of the state. Boxer on the other hand won almost all major metropolitan areas in the state. The race was called right when the polls closed at 11:00 P.M. EST, and 7:00 P.M. PTZ. Jones conceded defeat to Boxer at 11:12 P.M. EST, and 7:12 PTZ.

By county 
Final results from the Secretary of State of California.

See also 
 2004 United States Senate election

Notes

References

External links 
 JoinCalifornia 2004 General Election
 SmartVoter.org page on the California Senate race.
 Final results from the Secretary of State of California

2004
California
2004 California elections